Blackrock is a Gaelic Athletic Association club based in Kilfinane, County Limerick, Ireland. The club was founded in 1972 as a result of an amalgamation between the Kilfinane and Ardpatrick clubs and is named after the hill overlooking the two parishes. The club fields teams in both hurling and Gaelic football

Overview

Honours
 Limerick Premier Intermediate Hurling Championship: (1) 2019
 Limerick Intermediate Hurling Championship: (1) 1993
 All-Ireland Junior Club Hurling Championship: (1) 2010
 Munster Junior Club Hurling Championship: (1): 2009
 Limerick Junior Hurling Championship: (1): 2009

Notable players

 Pat Heffernan
 Richie McCarthy

References

External links
Clubs: South Division Clubs

Gaelic games clubs in County Limerick
Hurling clubs in County Limerick
Gaelic football clubs in County Limerick